Marco Antonio Villaseca Cabezas  (born March 15, 1975) is a Chilean former footballer who played as a defensive midfielder. Throughout his career, he had a reputation as a 'violent' player.

International career
Villaseca played for Chile at the 2001 Copa América where the team reached the quarter-finals. In total, he made twelve appearances for the national team. In addition, he made an appearance for Chile B in the friendly match against Catalonia on 28 December 2001.

Honours

Club
Colo-Colo
 Primera División de Chile (2): 1997 Clausura, 1998

References

External links
 Marco Villaseca at National-Football-Teams.com
 
 Marco Villaseca at PartidosdeLaRoja 

1975 births
Living people
Footballers from Santiago
Chilean footballers
Chilean expatriate footballers
Chile international footballers
2001 Copa América players
Audax Italiano footballers
Colo-Colo footballers
Unión Española footballers
FC Spartak Moscow players
FC Rostov players
Deportes Concepción (Chile) footballers
Santiago Morning footballers
Rangers de Talca footballers
O'Higgins F.C. footballers
Chilean Primera División players
Primera B de Chile players
Russian Premier League players
Expatriate footballers in Russia
Chilean expatriate sportspeople in Russia
Association football midfielders